The 1980 Belgian International Championships was a men's tennis tournament staged at the Leopold Club in Brussels, Belgium that was part of the Grand Prix circuit. The tournament was played on outdoor clay courts and was held from 9 June until 15 June 1980. It was the ninth edition of the tournament and third-seeded Peter McNamara won the singles title.

Finals

Singles
 Peter McNamara defeated  Balázs Taróczy 7–6, 6–3, 6–0
 It was McNamara's 1st singles title of the year and the 2nd of his career.

Doubles
 Thierry Stevaux /  Steve Krulevitz defeated  Eric Fromm /  Cary Leeds 6–3, 7–5

References

Belgian International Championships
Belgian International Championships
Belgian International Championships, 1980